Víctor Marco Soler (born 14 June 1982 in Valencia) is a Spanish former professional footballer who played mainly as a central defender but also as a left back.

External links

1982 births
Living people
Footballers from Valencia (city)
Spanish footballers
Association football defenders
Segunda División players
Segunda División B players
Tercera División players
Atlético Levante UD players
UB Conquense footballers
Mérida UD footballers
UE Lleida players
CF Villanovense players
CD Lugo players
Huracán Valencia CF players
CD Mensajero players
CF Torre Levante players